The Great Victorian Rail Trail (formerly Goulburn River High Country Rail Trail) is the second longest rail trail in Australia (after the 161km Brisbane Valley Rail Trail in Queensland), following the route of the former railway line from Tallarook, the Mansfield Railway and Alexandra Railway in north central Victoria, Australia, about  north-east of Melbourne. The trail surface is partially granitic sand and partly chert (a kind of gravel).

Its highlights include the  Cheviot Tunnel near Yea, views of the Goulburn River, the Heritage listed Trawool Valley and a former rail bridge over Lake Eildon near Bonnie Doon.

The towns passed through by the main rail trail are: Tallarook, Trawool, Kerrisdale, Homewood, Yea, Molesworth, Yarck, Kanumbra, Merton, Bonnie Doon, Maindample, Mansfield. The trail forks near Molesworth, leading to Alexandra.

History 
On 29 April 2009, the Federal Government announced that it would contribute A$13.2 million from its community infrastructure program out of the estimated total cost of A$14.2 million needed for the completion of the trail as an economic stimulus and as part of the recovery effort in the wake of the 2009 Victorian bushfires. The money was spent to repair and build bridges, road crossings, car parking, rest stops and amenities.

References

Great Victorian Rail Trails

Rail Trail Bike Tours

External links
www.greatvictorianrailtrails.com.au - Official site
Rail Trails of Australia
Trail Services
Goulburn River High Country Rail Trail map at Railtrails Australia
Bikely map

Rail trails in Victoria (Australia)